Leonard Stanley Kempthorne CBE (2 August 1886 – 25 July 1963) was a long-serving Anglican bishop in the 20th century.

Born into a Kiwi ecclesiastical family, Kempthorne was educated at Nelson College from 1900 to 1903, and at The Queen's College, Oxford. He was ordained in 1914. He worked for 18 months at Zaria in Northern Nigeria before a four-year stint as Chaplain to the Bishop of Lichfield. He was then Chaplain at Ipoh (Diocese of Singapore) in the Federated Malay States  from 1920 to 1922 when he  was appointed Bishop of Polynesia, a post he held for forty years.

Notes

1886 births
Alumni of The Queen's College, Oxford
Anglican bishops of Polynesia
20th-century Anglican bishops in Oceania
Commanders of the Order of the British Empire
1963 deaths
People educated at Nelson College